Styx is a rural locality in the local government area (LGA) of Derwent Valley in the South-east LGA region of Tasmania. The 2016 census recorded a population of nil for the state suburb of Styx.

History 
Styx is a confirmed locality.

Geography
The Styx River rises in the west of the locality and flows through to the east.

Road infrastructure 
Route B61 (Gordon River Road) passes to the north. From there, Styx Road provides access to the locality.

References

Towns in Tasmania
Localities of Derwent Valley Council